Col de Portel (el. 1,432 m.) is a mountain pass in the French Pyrenees between Saint-Girons   and Foix in the "massif de l'Arize".

Details of the climb 
From  Saint-Girons   (west), the climb to the Col de Portel crosses the Col de la Crouzette (1,241 m). To the Col de la Crouzette the climb is 11.2 km long, at an average gradient of 6.5%, with a short section at 10.8%. From the Col de la Crouzette to the summit is a further 3.5 km, gaining an extra 191 m, with the steepest section (near the summit) at 8.0%.

Starting from la Mouline, (east) the climb to the Col de Portel crosses the Mur de Péguère (1,375 m). To the Mur de Péguère the climb is 18 km long; over this distance, the climb is 872 m (an average of 4.8%). From the Mur de Péguère to the summit is a further 3.5 km, gaining a further 57 m height.

Appearances in the Tour de France 
The Col de Portel was crossed on stage 11 of the 2008 Tour de France.

See also
 List of highest paved roads in Europe
 List of mountain passes

External links
 Profile of climb from la Mouline to Col de Péguère on climbbybike.com
 Profile of climb from Col de la Crouzette to Col de Péguère on climbbybike.com
 Le col de Portel dans le Tour de France  
 Photos of Col de Portel

Mountain passes of Ariège (department)
Mountain passes of the Pyrenees
Transport in Occitania (administrative region)